Gianvito Martinelli (born 23 May 1969) is an Italian former professional racing cyclist. He rode in the 1994 Tour de France.

References

External links
 

1969 births
Living people
Italian male cyclists
Cyclists from Bergamo